The 2012 New Zealand Music Awards was the 47th holding of the annual ceremony featuring awards for musical recording artists based in or originating from New Zealand. Finalists for the three technical awards were announced on 3 October 2012, the date on which finalists for 16 'non-technical' categories were also revealed.

The Critics Choice prize was announced on Wednesday 17 October, at the Kings Arms Tavern in Auckland. It was won by Watercolours (Chelsea Jade Metcalf). 

The awards ceremony took place on 1 November 2012 at Vector Arena, Auckland. The ceremony was again hosted by television presenter Shannon Ryan and comedian Ben Boyce and was broadcast live on television channel Four.

The awards were dominated by Six60 with six awards, and Kimbra with five awards .

Nominees and winners
Winners are listed first and highlighted in boldface. 
Key
 – Non-technical award
 – Technical award

Presenters and performers

Performers
 Gin Wigmore performed "Man Like That"
 Annah Mac sang "Girl in Stilettos"
 Homebrew performed "Benefit"
 Members from Street Chant, Rackets and Tiny Ruins performed a tribute to Legacy Award winner Toy Love.

References

External links
Official New Zealand Music Awards website

New Zealand Music Awards, 2012
Music Awards, 2012
Aotearoa Music Awards
November 2012 events in New Zealand